The Moses Brewer House (also known as the Goulding House) is a historic late First Period house located in Sudbury, Massachusetts.

Description and history 
The oldest portion of this -story timber-framed house was built c. 1720–1730, and was apparently moved to its present site from its original location in Wayland sometime in the 18th century. It probably began as a "two cell" house (five bays wide and one deep) with central chimney, to which the rear leanto and a "Beverly jog" (a leanto portion that extends beyond the side of the house) were added later. The house underwent a major restoration in the 1920s. It has an original dog-leg staircase that ascends all the way into the attic, a relative rarity.

The house was listed on the National Register of Historic Places on March 9, 1990.

See also
National Register of Historic Places listings in Middlesex County, Massachusetts

References

Houses on the National Register of Historic Places in Middlesex County, Massachusetts
Buildings and structures in Sudbury, Massachusetts